Calliotropis keras is a species of sea snail, a marine gastropod mollusk in the family Eucyclidae.

Description
The length of the shell reaches 14 mm.

Distribution
This species occurs in the Pacific Ocean off Fiji and Tonga.

References

 Vilvens C. (2007) New records and new species of Calliotropis from Indo-Pacific. Novapex 8 (Hors Série 5): 1–72.

External links
 

keras
Gastropods described in 2007